The Winchester Historic District is a national historic district located at Winchester, Virginia.  The district encompasses 1,116 contributing buildings in Winchester.  The buildings represent a variety of popular architectural styles including Late Victorian and Italianate.  They include residential, commercial, governmental, industrial, and institutional buildings dating from the 18th to mid-20th centuries.  Notable buildings include the A.M.E Church (1878), Masonic Lodge and Gray and Eddy Building, First Presbyterian Church (1841, 1883), Farmers and Merchants Bank (1902), Frederick County Courthouse (1840), Grace Lutheran Church (1841, 1875), Friendship Fire Hall (1892), John Kerr School (1883, 1908), City Hall (1900), Lewis Jones Knitting Mill (1895), Tidball Residence (c. 1835), William F. Hottle Residence (c. 1880), McGuire Residence (c. 1820), and Robert Long House (c. 1930). Located in the district are the separately listed Thomas J. Jackson Headquarters, Fair Mount, Handley Library, Adam Kurtz House, and Daniel Morgan House.

It was listed on the National Register of Historic Places in 1980, with boundary increases in 2003, 2008, and 2016.

References

External links
Amherst Street, Alexander Tidball House, 138 Amherst Street, Winchester, Winchester, VA: 6 data pages at Historic American Buildings Survey
Amherst Street, William F. Hottle House, 132 Amherst Street, Winchester, Winchester, VA: 3 data pages at Historic American Buildings Survey
Amherst Street, Dr. William P. McGuire House & Office, 120 & 124 Amherst Street, Winchester, Winchester, VA: 8 data pages at Historic American Buildings Survey
Amherst Street, Edward McGuire House, 103 North Braddock Street, Winchester, Winchester, VA: 6 data pages at Historic American Buildings Survey
Amherst Street, Robert Long House, 101 North Washington Street, Winchester, Winchester, VA: 7 data pages at Historic American Buildings Survey
Amherst Street, Winchester, Winchester, VA: 6 measured drawings at Historic American Buildings Survey
Lawyer's Row, 30, 32, 34 & 36 Rouss Avenue, Winchester, Winchester, VA: 5 measured drawings and 2 data pages at Historic American Buildings Survey

Historic American Buildings Survey in Virginia
Historic districts on the National Register of Historic Places in Virginia
Italianate architecture in Virginia
Victorian architecture in Virginia
Buildings and structures in Winchester, Virginia
National Register of Historic Places in Winchester, Virginia